Melvyn John Stride (born 30 September 1961) is a British politician who has served as Secretary of State for Work and Pensions since October 2022. He previously served in the May Government as Financial Secretary to the Treasury and Paymaster General from 2017 to 2019 and as Leader of the House of Commons and Lord President of the Council from May to July 2019. He also served as Chair of the Treasury Select Committee from 2019 to 2022. A member of the Conservative Party, he has been the Member of Parliament (MP) for Central Devon since 2010.

Early life
Mel Stride was born in Ealing, London in 1961. He was educated at Portsmouth Grammar School, and then read Philosophy, Politics and Economics at St Edmund Hall, Oxford, where he was elected President of the Oxford Union.

In 1987, Stride set up a business specialising in trade exhibitions, conferences and publishing (Venture Marketing Group) which he and his wife jointly controlled before selling it to a United States subsidiary.

Political career
Stride was selected as prospective Conservative candidate for Central Devon in June 2006 after his name was added to the Conservative A-List in 2006. He was the first A-Lister to be selected.

Stride was elected as the MP for Central Devon at the 2010 general election. On 28 October 2011, Stride was appointed Parliamentary Private Secretary to the Minister of State for Further Education, Skills and Lifelong Learning, John Hayes. Stride was promoted to the frontbench as Lord Commissioner of the Treasury after the 2015 general election, and became Comptroller of the Household following the appointment of Theresa May as Prime Minister. Stride was opposed to Brexit prior to the 2016 referendum.

Ministerial career: 2017-2019
Following the 2017 general election, Stride was appointed Financial Secretary to the Treasury. In this role in April 2019, Stride was accused by MPs of breaking the Ministerial Code over comments he had made in relation to the Loan Charge.

Stride was appointed Leader of the House of Commons and Lord President of the Council on 23 May 2019, following the resignation of Andrea Leadsom. Stride endorsed Michael Gove to become Leader of the Conservative Party in the 2019 leadership election. Following Boris Johnson's election as party leader and appointment Prime Minister he was dismissed from his role as Leader of the House of Commons and replaced by Jacob Rees-Mogg.

Backbencher: 2019-2022
On 23 October 2019, Stride was elected Chair of the Treasury Select Committee, replacing Nicky Morgan. Stride supported Rishi Sunak in the July-September 2022 Conservative Party leadership election, serving as his campaign chief, and lent his support to him again in the October 2022 Conservative Party leadership election.

Secretary of State for Work and Pensions: 2022-present
Upon the appointment of Rishi Sunak as Prime Minister, Stride returned to the frontbench having been appointed Secretary of State for Work and Pensions.

Personal life 
Stride is married to Michelle and has three daughters.

References

External links

Official site

Mel Stride MP Conservative Party profile
Official channel at YouTube

|-

|-

|-

|-

|-

1961 births
Living people
Alumni of St Edmund Hall, Oxford
Presidents of the Oxford University Conservative Association
Conservative Party (UK) MPs for English constituencies
People educated at The Portsmouth Grammar School
Presidents of the Oxford Union
UK MPs 2010–2015
UK MPs 2015–2017
UK MPs 2017–2019
UK MPs 2019–present
Secretaries of State for Work and Pensions
Lord Presidents of the Council
Members of the Privy Council of the United Kingdom
Members of the Parliament of the United Kingdom for constituencies in Devon